was a Japanese idol group. The group disbanded after a final live show on September 24, 2018.

Members

Timeline

Discography

Singles

Albums

mini Albums

Music videos

References

External links 
  

Akihabara
Japanese idol groups
Japanese girl groups
Japanese pop music groups
Musical quintets
Musical groups established in 2012
2012 establishments in Japan
Pony Canyon artists
Musical groups disestablished in 2018
2018 disestablishments in Japan